The Azerbaijani National Road Race Championships is a cycling race where the Azerbaijani cyclists contest who will become the champion for the year to come.

Men

Elite

U23

Women

See also
Azerbaijani National Time Trial Championships
National Road Cycling Championships

References

National road cycling championships
Cycle races in Azerbaijan